Igor Nikolayevich Kuznechenkov (born 3 January 1966) is a former Russian professional footballer.

Club career
He made his Russian Football National League debut for FC APK Azov on 25 April 1992 in a game against FC Spartak Anapa. That was his only season in the FNL.

External links
 

1966 births
People from Velikiye Luki
Living people
Soviet footballers
Russian footballers
Association football forwards
FC Zenit Saint Petersburg players
FC Dynamo Saint Petersburg players
FC Spartak-UGP Anapa players
FC APK Morozovsk players
Mikkelin Palloilijat players
Veikkausliiga players
Russian expatriate footballers
Expatriate footballers in the Czech Republic
Expatriate footballers in Finland
Sportspeople from Pskov Oblast
FC Torpedo Vladimir players